Sweden has for political and dynastic reasons been in union with other kingdoms and princely states, ostensibly personal unions.

Norway (I) and Skåneland
In 1319 the infant Magnus Eriksson was crowned as king of both Sweden and Norway. In 1332 when the King of Denmark Christopher II died as a "king without a country" after he had pawned Denmark piece by piece, King Magnus took advantage of his neighbour's distress, redeeming the pawn for the eastern Danish provinces for a huge amount of silver, and thus also became king of Skåneland. The union of these three countries lasted until 1343 when Magnus preemptively let his son Haakon, succeed him to the Norwegian throne, though he would still rule as regent during his son's minority, which ended in 1355, when Haakon came of age. In 1360 the Danish king Valdemar Atterdag reconquered Skåneland.

Kalmar Union

In 1397 the three Scandinavian kingdoms of Sweden, Norway and Denmark were united in the Kalmar Union, a personal union agreed upon in the Swedish city of Kalmar. After only a few decades the relationship between Sweden and the leading power Denmark had deteriorated into open conflict. The period until the dissolution in 1521 was marked by the constant strife between Sweden and Denmark. The union was sometimes made defunct by Sweden electing a monarch separate from the union king, and on one occasion Sweden and Norway were even de facto united in a personal union in opposition to the union monarch.

Grand Duchy of Lithuania 

In 1665, Lithuania and Sweden signed the Treaty and Union of Kėdainiai. This personal union de facto established Lithuania as Sweden's protectorate with Charles X Gustav serving as its Grand Duke of Lithuania. Following Sweden's defeat in the Second Northern War, the protectorate was terminated in 1657.

Poland-Lithuania

In 1592 Sigismund succeeded his father John III of Sweden to the Swedish throne, but after the Polish election in 1587 and confirmation of GDL Natural and legal rights in 1588 he had also been elected king of Poland–Lithuania making him the monarch of both nations. Sigismund, who was a Roman Catholic failed however to gain support in Lutheran Sweden, and was eventually deposed and succeeded by his uncle Charles IX in Sweden 1599.

Palatine Zweibrücken
In 1654, Christina abdicated and was succeeded by her cousin Charles X, Duke of Palatine Zweibrücken. Sweden and Zweibrücken were also united under Charles XI and Charles XII, until the death of the latter in 1718, at which point he was succeeded by his sister Ulrike Eleonora on the Swedish throne, but not in his German Duchy.

Hesse-Kassel
Frederick I of Sweden had acceded to the Swedish throne when his wife, Ulrike Eleonora, abdicated in his favour in 1721. In 1730 he was also in line of succession to the duchy of Hesse-Kassel, which resulted in a personal union that lasted until his death in 1751.

Norway (III)

By the Treaty of Kiel in 1814 the king of Denmark-Norway ceded Norway to the king of Sweden, an event which likely would have resulted in a full political union between Sweden and Norway. The treaty however never came into force, as Norway adopted a constitution and declared independence. Sweden, which would not accept this outcome, went to war and forced Norway into accepting a personal union with Sweden. The two kingdoms had full inner autonomy and separate institutions, sharing only the monarch and the foreign policy, which was conducted by the Swedish foreign office. The new Bernadotte dynasty could just as well be termed Norwegian until the dissolution of the union in 1905.

European Union

In 1995 Sweden joined the European Union after holding a referendum on the matter. The European Union at present constitutes 27 European states. The organisation is a political union where each state is technically allowed to conduct their own foreign policy (though a loose joint policy is in place).

Table

See also
Sweden
List of Swedish monarchs

External links
History of Sweden - Maps depicting the territorial evolution of Sweden

Political history of Sweden